
Gmina Stary Sącz is an urban-rural gmina (administrative district) in Nowy Sącz County, Lesser Poland Voivodeship, in southern Poland.

Villages
Apart from the town of Stary Sącz, Gmina Stary Sącz contains the villages and settlements of Barcice Dolne, Barcice Górne, Gaboń, Gaboń-Praczka, Gołkowice Dolne, Gołkowice Górne, Łazy Biegonickie, Mostki, Moszczenica Niżna, Moszczenica Wyżna, Myślec, Popowice, Przysietnica, Skrudzina and Wola Krogulecka.

Neighbouring gminas
Gmina Stary Sącz is bordered by the towns of Nowy Sącz and Szczawnica, and by the gminas of Łącko, Nawojowa, Podegrodzie and Rytro.

References
Polish official population figures 2006

Stary Sacz
Nowy Sącz County